Tetyana Trehubová (born 14 March 1989) is a Ukrainian-born Slovak handball player who plays for IUVENTA Michalovce and the Slovak national team.

References

1989 births
Living people
Sportspeople from Uzhhorod
Slovak female handball players
Ukrainian female handball players
Naturalized citizens of Slovakia
Expatriate handball players
Ukrainian expatriate sportspeople in Slovakia
Naturalised sports competitors